Overall Creek (sometimes called Overalls Creek) is a stream in the U.S. state of Tennessee, a tributary of the West Fork of the Stones River.

Overall Creek has the name of Robert Overall, a pioneer settler.

See also
List of rivers of Tennessee

References

Rivers of Rutherford County, Tennessee
Rivers of Tennessee